Scărișoara is a commune in Olt County, Oltenia, Romania. It is composed of three villages: Plăviceni, Rudari and Scărișoara.

References

Communes in Olt County
Localities in Oltenia